Oliver Taylor  (1869 – 1945) was a Welsh international footballer. He was part of the Wales national football team between 1893 and 1894, playing 4 matches. He played his first match on 18 March 1893 against Scotland and his last match on 24 March 1894 against Scotland .

See also
 List of Wales international footballers (alphabetical)

References

1869 births
1945 deaths
Welsh footballers
Wales international footballers
Place of birth missing
Date of death missing
Association footballers not categorized by position